Monroe is a settlement in Newfoundland and Labrador.

Monroe is situated on the picturesque inland waterway of Smith Sound, Trinity Bay, Newfoundland.  The community was named Monroe when the two settlements of Rocky Brook and Upper Rocky Brook amalgamated in 1912 and was named for the merchant Walter Stanley Monroe, of St. John's, who later became the Prime Minister of the Dominion of Newfoundland from 1924 to 1928.

Monroe was first settled by Henry and Patience (née Meagher) Stone in 1853 and the couple brought their six, at that time, children to live with them.  Henry and Patience Stone had 4 more children in the next 5 years, with Emmanuel baptized January 23,1854 being the first child to be born after the couple founded the community of Rocky Brook, now called Monroe today, in 1853.

The 6 children Henry and Patience brought to the community with them were Rebecca and Elizabeth who Henry had with his dead first wife Mary Spurrell, and the couple’s 4 daughters Mary, Naomi, Caroline and Emily.  The 4 children born after they moved to Rocky Brook/Monroe were Emmanuel, Alfred John, Mary and Christina.

Populated places in Newfoundland and Labrador